Kurtlyn Mannikam (born 19 January 1996) is a South African cricketer. He was included in the KZN Inland squad for the 2016 Africa T20 Cup. In April 2021, he was named in KwaZulu-Natal Inland's squad, ahead of the 2021–22 cricket season in South Africa.

References

External links
 

1996 births
Living people
South African cricketers
KwaZulu-Natal Inland cricketers
Place of birth missing (living people)